Francisco Viacava (born 22 March 1961) is a Peruvian rower. He competed in the men's coxed pair event at the 1984 Summer Olympics.

References

1961 births
Living people
Peruvian male rowers
Olympic rowers of Peru
Rowers at the 1984 Summer Olympics
Place of birth missing (living people)
Pan American Games medalists in rowing
Pan American Games bronze medalists for Peru
Rowers at the 1983 Pan American Games
20th-century Peruvian people
21st-century Peruvian people